The 2022 Superliga Colombiana (officially known as the Superliga BetPlay DIMAYOR 2022 for sponsorship purposes) was the eleventh edition of the Superliga Colombiana, Colombia's football super cup tournament organized by DIMAYOR. It was contested by Deportes Tolima and Deportivo Cali, champions of the 2021 Categoría Primera A season tournaments, from 9 to 23 February 2022.

Deportes Tolima won their first title in the competition, defeating Deportivo Cali by a 2–1 aggregate score.

Teams

Matches

First leg

Second leg

Deportes Tolima won 2–1 on aggregate.

References

External links
Superliga on Dimayor's website

Superliga Colombiana
Superliga Colombiana
Superliga Colombiana